Christos Patsalides is a Cypriot Lawyer, politician and a former Minister of Health of the Republic of Cyprus. He was also the president of  the Sixty-fourth World Health Assembly.

References

Year of birth missing (living people)
Living people
Cypriot physicians
Health ministers of Cyprus
Cypriot politicians
Cyprus Ministers of the Interior